Toby King may refer to:

 Toby King (footballer, born 1970), Scottish former football midfielder
 Toby King (rugby league) (born 1996), English rugby league player
 Toby King (footballer, born 2002), English football midfielder for West Brom